The Ghazipur City–Bandra Terminus Express is an Express train belonging to Western Railway zone that runs between  and  in India. It is currently being operated with 19042/19041 train numbers on Bi-weekly basis.

Service

19042/Ghazipur City–Bandra Terminus Express has an average speed of 56 km/hr and covers 1922 km in 35h 05m.

The 19041/Bandra Terminus–Ghazipur City Express has an average speed of 50 km/hr and covers 1922 km in 36h 20m.

Route and halts 

The important halts of the train are:

Coach composition

The train has standard LHB rakes with max speed of 130 kmph. The train consists of 22 coaches:

 1 AC II Tier
 5 AC III Tier
 10 Sleeper coaches
 1 Pantry car
 3 General
 2 End-on Generator

Traction

Both trains are hauled by a Ratlam Loco Shed-based WDM-3A diesel locomotive from Ghazipur City to Ratlam. From Ratlam it is hauled by a Vadodara Loco Shed-based WAP-4E Electric locomotive until Bandra Terminus and vice versa.

Rake sharing

The train shares its rake with 22936/22935 Bandra Terminus Palitana Express.

See also 
 Shabd Bhedi Superfast Express
 Suhaildev Superfast Express
 Kolkata–Ghazipur City Weekly Express

Notes

References

External links 
 19042/Ghazipur City - Bandra Terminus Weekly Express India Rail Info
 19041/Mumbai Bandra Terminus - Ghazipur City Weekly Express India Rail Info

Transport in Mumbai
Transport in Ghazipur
Express trains in India
Rail transport in Maharashtra
Rail transport in Gujarat
Rail transport in Madhya Pradesh
Rail transport in Rajasthan
Rail transport in Uttar Pradesh
Railway services introduced in 2017